Zakrzewo-Zalesie  is a village in the administrative district of Gmina Szulborze Wielkie, within Ostrów Mazowiecka County, Masovian Voivodeship, in East-central Poland.

References

Zakrzewo-Zalesie